Poseidon Expeditions is a leading provider of polar expeditions in the cruise industry. The company was started up in 1999 as a tour operator specializing in expedition cruises to the North Pole and the Russian High Arctic aboard icebreakers and ice-strengthened ships. Today Poseidon Expeditions offers expedition cruises to Antarctica, the North Pole and the Arctic destinations of Svalbard, Greenland, Franz Josef Land and Iceland.

History 

1999 The company was started up in the U.K.

2001 Poseidon Expeditions operated the first North Pole cruise aboard the Yamal icebreaker.

2003 Poseidon Expeditions operated two cruises to Franz Josef Land and Svalbard aboard the 100-passenger icebreaker Kapitan Dranitsyn.

2004 The company operated the inaugural «Transpolar Bridge» expedition cruise through the Northeast Passage, including Franz Josef Land, North Pole, Severnaya Zemlya Archipelago, Taymyr Peninsula, Lena River Delta, New Siberian Islands and Wrangel Island aboard the Yamal icebreaker.

2005 Poseidon Expeditions operated the inaugural «Pearls of the Russian Arctic» expedition cruise including Novaya Zemlya, Oranskie Islands, Vise Island, Severnaya Zemlya and the ruins of Khabarovo Gulag aboard the Kapitan Dranitsyn.

2007 Poseidon Expeditions introduced a new destination to the travel market – the Russian Far East (Kamchatka, Kuril Islands, Wrangel Island). aboard 115-passenger ship Marina Tsvetaeva (now MV Ortelius).

2008 Poseidon Expeditions chartered the world's most powerful nuclear-powered icebreaker 50 Years of Victory during its first season in tourism service.

2013 A Poseidon Expedition's cruise accomplished the 100th attainment of the North Pole in the history of icebreaker navigation - this historic event occurred on July 30, 2013 at 20:49 GMT.

2014 Poseidon Expeditions started operating Antarctic expedition cruises aboard a small ship Sea Explorer with one voyage including the Falkland Islands & South Georgia.

2015 Poseidon Expeditions began operating polar cruises to the Arctic and Antarctica aboard all-suite expedition ship, m/v Sea Spirit. and introduced a new destination to the travel market - cruises to the British Isles.

2016 The company marketed its first West Greenland cruises.

2021 Poseidon Expeditions was named the world’s best operator of expedition cruises to the polar regions at the 28th annual World Travel Awards.

2022 Poseidon Expeditions became the winner of the International Travel Awards as the best polar expedition cruise operator 2022.

Poseidon Expeditions' fleet 

For 23 years of polar cruising Poseidon Expeditions has charted a number of vessels such as the Yamal icebreaker, the icebreaker Kapitan Dranitsyn, passenger ships Marina Tsvetaeva and the Sea Explorer. 
Nowadays Poseidon Expeditions operates its Arctic and Antarctic cruises aboard a small expeditions ship Sea Spirit. She can navigate into protected channels and bays that are out of bounds to larger cruise vessels.  Providing spacious suites for accommodation of 114 passengers, m/v Sea Spirit at the same time features maneuverability and friendly atmosphere of small ships. The vessel has an ice-strengthened hull, a fleet of Zodiac Nautic, and a set of retractable fin stabilizers for smoother sailing.

Since 2008, Poseidon Expeditions has operated North Pole cruises aboard the 124-passenger nuclear-powered Russian icebreaker  50 Years of Victory.

50 Years of Victory, the most modern nuclear-powered icebreaker in the world, is equipped with helicopters and rubber inflatable boats, enabling travelers to explore wild Arctic areas. 

However, as a result of the Russia-Ukraine conflict, Poseidon Expeditions has put on hold its cruises that travel in Russian territory.

Company highlights 

Poseidon Expeditions is a member in good standing of IAATO and AECO, and promotes various sustainability initiatives.

Poseidon Expeditions is the only operator in the industry offering direct sailing from Longyearbyen to Franz Josef Land within 1.5 days.

The company is an advocate of the small ship concept which allows cruise passengers to have maximum time ashore and enjoy the greatest variety and selection of landing sites. Helicopter tours, photography workshops, camping, kayaking, educational lectures and briefings are offered by an expert polar team.

References

1999 establishments in Cyprus
Transport companies established in 1999
Expedition cruising
Cruise lines